Harmonic motion can mean:
the displacement of the particle executing oscillatory motion that can be expressed in terms of sine or cosine functions known as harmonic motion .

The motion of a Harmonic oscillator (in physics), which can be:
Simple harmonic motion
Complex harmonic motion
Keplers laws of planetary motion (in physics, known as the harmonic law)
Quasi-harmonic motion
Musica universalis (in medieval astronomy, the music of the spheres)
Chord progression (in music, harmonic progression)

See also
Pendulum
Harmonograph
Circular motion